The Louisiana State Sovereignty Commission was a government agency of the Louisiana state government established to combat desegregation, which operated from June 1960 to 1967 in the capitol city of Baton Rouge, Louisiana. The group warned of "creeping federalism", and opposed school racial integration. It allied with the Louisiana Joint Legislative Committee on Un-American Activities, and coordinated with the Mississippi State Sovereignty Commission.

History 
Following the Brown v. Board of Education (1954) ruling by the Supreme Court of the United States, the court declared school segregation unconstitutional. As a response to Brown v. Board of Education, Louisiana Governor Jimmie Davis created this group through the passage of state legislation. The Mississippi State Sovereignty Commission was founded in 1956, and was the organizational template for the Louisiana State Sovereignty Commission, and the Alabama State Sovereignty Commission. A former candidate for governor, Frank Voelker, Jr. had led the Louisiana group in 1962 to 1963. Sam B. Short served as the group's executive director.

The anti-segregation propaganda film A Way of Life (1961), was released for the group as part of the Louisiana: A History series, produced by Avalon Daggett. The film showed a peaceful coexistence of black and white people within the state, and features Louisiana Governor Jimmie Davis speaking on states' rights. 

The group employed investigators and was prosecuted for the use of illegal wiretaps in order to victimize Wade Mackie, of the American Friends Service Committee; Irvin Cheney, the former pastor of the Broadmoor Baptist Church in Baton Rouge; and Marvin Reznikoff the Rabbi of the Liberal Synagouge. Yasuhiro Katagiri wrote in his 2009 book the records for Louisiana's group were "apparently burned" after they ceased operations.

Legacy 
In declassified FBI documents (through FOIA) reported in 2016, former state governor John McKeithen, with the help of the organization had privately raised money for Ku Klux Klan leaders within the state.

Archival records for the Louisiana State Sovereignty Commission can be found at the Civil Rights Digital Library at the Digital Library of Georgia, the American Archive of Public Broadcasting, and the Mississippi Department of Archives and History.

Publications

See also 

 School integration in the United States
 States' rights
 White supremacy

References

Organizations based in Baton Rouge, Louisiana
1960 establishments in Louisiana
1967 disestablishments in Louisiana
Defunct organizations based in Louisiana
History of racism in Louisiana
Government agencies disestablished in 1967
School segregation in the United States
African-American history of Louisiana
Government agencies established in 1960